Lonas is a genus of flowering plants in the chamomile tribe within the daisy family. There is only one accepted species, Lonas annua,  native to Italy, France, Germany, Algeria, Morocco, and Tunisia.

References

Anthemideae
Monotypic Asteraceae genera